Father John Redmond Catholic Secondary School and Regional Arts Centre (also known as Father John Redmond, Father John Redmond CSS and RAC, FJRCSS, FJR, or Redmond in short) is a Catholic high school in Toronto, Ontario, Canada. It is located in the New Toronto area of Etobicoke. It is operated by the Toronto Catholic District School Board (previously the Metropolitan Separate School Board) as a regional art school for grades 9-12.

Redmond was founded in the spring of 1985 as the south campus of Etobicoke's first Catholic high school, Michael Power/St. Joseph High School, merged in 1982 and then became a separate, standard high school in 1986. The Regional Arts Program has since started in 2006. The school was named after Father John Redmond C.S.B. (1934-September 21, 1981), a teacher, coach, educator, priest, and principal of Michael Power.

History

Origins
Father John Redmond C.S.B. was born in Weston, Ontario in 1934 and aspired to helping others all his life. He was a faithful priest, dedicated teacher and accomplished coach. Educated in Toronto at St. Michael's College School and later University of Windsor, Father Redmond was ordained a Basilian priest in 1963.

His entire professional teaching career, which spanned from 1963 to his death on September 21, 1981, revolved around Michael Power Catholic High School. He was the school's athletic director for thirteen years, principal from 1976 to 1981, and nineteen years as a teacher.  He helped develop thousands of Etobicoke teenagers into responsible adults through his example of a Christian life and through the discipline of sport.

Under Redmond's tutelage, Power won fifteen Toronto and District College School Athletic Association Track Championships and, provincially, nine out of ten Ontario Federation of Secondary Schools Association Crowns.  In 1976, an American reporter wrote that the Power track team won a US invitational meet over 243 schools "handily".

Redmond was inducted into the Etobicoke Sports Hall of Fame in 1999.

Background

During a period of reorganization by public school boards across Ontario following a decision by the Ontario Government to extend funding of Catholic schools to include secondary school grades 10 to 13 (OAC) in the 1980s, many public schools of the Etobicoke Board of Education  in southern Etobicoke with low enrollment were ceded to the Metropolitan Separate School Board (later the Toronto Catholic District School Board).

Originally offered the former Mimico High School (now John English Junior Middle School), the MSSB preferred the newer, designed buildings of Kingsmill Secondary School (later Bishop Allen Academy), which were already nearby, requested the former Alderwood Collegiate Institute in Alderwood (which was closed in June 1983) to serve the rest of southern Etobicoke; Alderwood reopened as the South campus outlet of Etobicoke's first Catholic high school, Michael Power/St. Joseph High School. The school's namesake, Father John Redmond was named in his honor after serving as a Basilian priest, a principal, an educator, and prominent national track and field coach. The roots clearly relied on the Basilian motto of "Teach me Goodness, Discipline and Knowledge."

The South campus of MPSJ opened its doors in spring 1985 with 17 staff and 300 students under vice-principal Jack Smith. On September 2, 1986, the Father John Redmond community was established with the motto of Cursum Consumavi Fidem Servavi ("I Have Finished The Race, I Have Kept The Faith"). Jack Smith is the founding principal of the new school. In its first year, Father Redmond Catholic Secondary School had an enrollment of 427 students in grades 9, 10 and 11. By September 1987 grades 12 and OAC had been added and the student population reached 1140 students.

The 1960s school buildings were in a very bad state of repair forced Father John Redmond to relocate to newly constructed buildings in New Toronto (St. Teresa's parish), on the Lakeshore Psychiatric Hospital grounds beside the historic 19th century buildings of the Mimico Lunatic Asylum, which are now the site of Humber College's Lakeshore Campus, in September 2006. As the Toronto Catholic District School Board does not operate an arts school in Etobicoke, Father John Redmond was chosen as the Catholic board's Regional Arts Centre on June 12, 2005. The school serves Catholic students from the former Lakeshore Municipalities (Mimico, New Toronto, Long Branch) in southern Etobicoke.

Feeder Schools
St. Leo Catholic Elementary School, Mimico
Holy Trinity Catholic Elementary School
St. Ambrose Catholic Elementary School
 St. Josaphat Catholic Elementary School (Ukrainian Catholic)

Notable alumni

 Brendan Frederick Shanahan - Former NHL player, current president of Toronto Maple Leafs 
 Dave Bolland - Former NHL hockey player
 Brendan Smith - NHL hockey player
 Rory Smith - NLL lacrosse player
 Reilly Smith - NHL hockey player

See also
List of high schools in Ontario
Alderwood Collegiate Institute - The original site of Father John Redmond from 1986 to 2006.

References

External links
 Father John Redmond Catholic Secondary School and Regional Arts Centre
 TCDSB Portal

Toronto Catholic District School Board
High schools in Toronto
Education in Etobicoke
Catholic secondary schools in Ontario
Art schools in Canada
Educational institutions established in 1986
1986 establishments in Ontario
Basilian schools
Relocated schools